BD5, Bd5 or BD-5 may refer to:

Places 

 BD5 (postcode district), a district of the Bradford postcode area in the UK.
 ISO-3166:BD-05, the ISO 3166-2:BD subdivision code for Bagerhat District, Bangladesh

In science and technology 

 BD5 (Blu-ray format), an unofficial name for a Blu-ray disc format using a single-layer 4.7 GB DVD
 Bede BD-5, a small kit aircraft by Bede Aviation
 1998 BD5, a designation for the asteroid 10628 Feuerbacher

Other uses 

 Bd5, a chess move recorded in algebraic notation.